Richard A. Westman (born 1959) is a Republican politician who was elected and currently serves in the Vermont House of Representatives. He was a Representative of the Lamoille-4 Representative District. Since 2011, he has served as state senator for Lamoille district.

References

1959 births
Living people
Republican Party members of the Vermont House of Representatives
Republican Party Vermont state senators
21st-century American politicians